Hwanggan station is a railway station on the Gyeongbu Line. Hwangsan station opened its business on January 1, 1905, and it belongs to Yeongdong County, North Chungcheong Province, and has an average of 200 passengers per day. 

The famous places around Hwanggan are Minjuji mountain, Wollyu-bong, Baekhwa mountain, Banya temple, and Mulhan Valley, which are popular places for many users. Grapes, walnuts, and persimmons are famous for their local specialties.

References

Railway stations in North Chungcheong Province